Philip Opiyo (born 27 February 1979) is a former footballer who played professionally in South Africa and represented the Kenya national football team.

Career
Opiyo made his Kenyan Premier League debut playing as a central defender for Mathare United in 1999. He played for Mathare United until 2003, finishing runner-up in the league's player of the year voting in 2001.

After a brief spell with Tusker in 2003, Opiyo moved to South Africa to sign with Premier Soccer League side Free State Stars. The following season he joined Umtata Bush Bucks, but he was suspended by the league following a failed drugs test in February 2005.

Opiyo returned to Kenya where he begin playing club football again with Sofapaka in 2007. A year later, he joined Bandari, where he would play until retiring.

Opiyo has made several appearances for Kenya, playing in the 2004 African Cup of Nations finals and four 2006 FIFA World Cup qualifying matches.

References

External links

1979 births
Living people
Kenyan footballers
Kenyan expatriate footballers
Kenya international footballers
2004 African Cup of Nations players
Mathare United F.C. players
Tusker F.C. players
Free State Stars F.C. players
Bush Bucks F.C. players
Sofapaka F.C. players
Expatriate soccer players in South Africa
Kenyan expatriates in South Africa
Bandari F.C. (Kenya) players
Association football defenders